Salix bebbiana is a species of willow indigenous to Canada and the northern United States, from Alaska and Yukon south to California and Arizona and northeast to Newfoundland and New England. Common names include beaked willow, long-beaked willow, gray willow, and Bebb's willow.
This species is also called red willow by Native Americans according to The Arctic Prairies Appendix E by Ernest Tompson Seton.

This plant is typically a large, fast-growing, multiple-stemmed shrub or small, shrubby tree capable of forming dense, colonial thickets. It can be found in loose, saturated soils such as that on riverbanks, lakesides, swamps, marshes, and bogs. It is capable of tolerating heavy clay and rocky soils, making it highly adaptable and durable. It is a dominant species in many marshland areas in its native range.

Leaves are alternately arranged, simple, and ovate in shape, widest near the midrib and narrowing to a tapering base and pointed tip. The leaf edges are generally entire, though sometimes finely serrated. The leaves are dull blue-green in color and smooth in texture when mature; new leaves are coated in downy hairs. The leaves are up to 5 in long and 1.5 in wide. Like other willows, this plant is dioecious, with male and female plants producing small, dangling catkins. Female flowers yield spherical seeds covered in long, threadlike fibers that help them disperse on the wind. The plant also spreads via vegetative reproduction, sprouting from the base of the stem or from segments of root, and by layering, allowing the plant to form colonies of clones.

This is the most important species of diamond willow, a type of willow which produces fine, colorful wood used for carving. The twigs and branches are used by Native Americans for basket weaving and arrowmaking. Important host plant to 312 species of butterflies and moths

Many parts of the plant are consumed by animals, especially domestic cattle, which find the foliage a palatable forage.

This species readily hybridizes with several other species of willow.

References

External links

 
 Jepson Manual eFlora (TJM2) treatment of Salix bebbiana
 
 
 

bebbiana
Flora of the Northwestern United States
Flora of Western Canada
Flora of the Southwestern United States
Flora of the North-Central United States
Flora of the Great Lakes region (North America)
Flora of Eastern Canada
Flora of the Northeastern United States
Flora of Alaska
Flora of California
Trees of the Northeastern United States
Plants described in 1895
Flora without expected TNC conservation status